SC 38 or SC-38 may refer to:

South Carolina Highway 38
, a United States Navy submarine chaser in commission from 1918 to 1919
Star Wars: SC 38 – Reimagined, a 2019 Star Wars fan project